The Guangzhou–Meizhou–Shantou railway is a railway in Guangdong Province, China. The line was built from 1991 to 1995. The Changping to Huizhou section was opened on 1 July 1992. It extends across the eastern half of Guangdong Province from Guangzhou to Meizhou in the interior and then south to Shantou on the coast. Cities along the route include Guangzhou, Dongguan, Huizhou, Heyuan, Longchuan, Xingning, Meizhou, Fengshun, Jieyang, Chaozhou and Shantou. In 1996, the Guangzhou-Longchuan section of the line became the southernmost section of the Beijing–Kowloon railway.

Rail connections
 Guangzhou: Beijing–Guangzhou railway, Guangzhou–Shenzhen railway, Guangzhou–Maoming railway

See also

List of railways in China
Meizhou–Shantou railway

References

Rail transport in Guangdong
Railway lines in China